Chione is a genus of American tropical marine bivalve molluscs, in the family Veneridae.

Species
This is a complete list of the extant species. Extinct fossil species are listed further down.

 Chione amathusia (Philippi, 1844)
 Chione californiensis W. J. Broderip, 1835 - California venus, Banded venus
 Chione cancellata Linnaeus, 1767 - Cross-barred venus
 Chione chione 
 Chione cingenda
 Chione compta T. Say, 1822
 Chione elevata W. J. Broderip, 1835
 Chione fluctifraga
 Chione gnidea (Broderip and Sowerby, 1829)
 Chione grus
 Chione guatulcoensis L. G. Hertlein & Strong, 1948
 Chione kellettii (Hinds, 1845)
 Chione mariae (d'orbigny, 1846)
 Chione mazyckii W. H. Dall, 1902
 Chione paphia (Linnaeus, 1767) - King venus
 Chione picta Willett, 1944
 Chione pubera (Bory Saint-Vicent, 1827)
 Chione pulicaria (Broderip, 1835)
 Chione purpurissata Dall, 1902
 Chione squamosa (Carpenter, 1857)
 Chione subimbricata Sowerby, 1835
 Chione subrugosa (Wood, 1828) - Semi-rough chione
 Chione succincta Linnaeus, 1767
 Chione tumens A. E. Verrill, 1870
 Chione undatella G. B. Sowerby I, 1835 - Frilled venus, Wavy venus

Here is an incomplete list of extinct Chione species:

 Chione burnsii (Dall, 1900)
 Chione chipolana (Dall, 1903)
 Chione erosa (Dall, 1903)

References
 
 
 

Veneridae
Bivalve genera